Enes Tubluk (born 3 June 2000) is a German-Turkish footballer who plays as a forward for Turkish club Şanlıurfaspor.

Career
He signed for Viktoria Köln from 1899 Hoffenheim II in August 2020.

References

2000 births
German people of Turkish descent
People from Eberbach (Baden)
Sportspeople from Karlsruhe (region)
Footballers from Baden-Württemberg
Living people
German footballers
Association football forwards
TSG 1899 Hoffenheim II players
FC Viktoria Köln players
Utaş Uşakspor footballers
Şanlıurfaspor footballers
Regionalliga players
3. Liga players
TFF Second League players
German expatriate footballers
Expatriate footballers in Turkey
German expatriate sportspeople in Turkey